"Shine" is a song by American singer-songwriter Luther Vandross, the first single from his greatest hits package The Ultimate Luther Vandross. The track samples Chic's song "My Forbidden Lover". "Shine" became a top-20 urban radio hit, and the club mixes of the song became popular on dance radio stations and clubs in the United States. The single was a top-50 hit in the United Kingdom but failed to chart on the US Billboard Hot 100 despite reaching number 31 on the Billboard Hot R&B/Hip Hop Songs chart. In 2007, British dance music duo Booty Luv released a cover version that reached the top 20 in several European countries.

Track listings
UK CD single
 "Shine" (Radio edit) - 3:51
 "Shine" (Freemasons radio edit) - 3:40

US 12-inch single
 "Shine" (Album version) - 4:50
 "Shine" (Freemasons Club Mix) - 7:38
 "Shine" (Freemasons Dub Mix) - 6:32 
 "Shine" (Acapella version) - 4:34
 Contains a sample from "My Forbidden Lover" written by Bernard Edwards and Nile Rodgers as performed by Chic.

Charts

Weekly charts

Year-end charts

Booty Luv version

Due to the club mix of the Luther Vandross version of "Shine" becoming popular, the song was covered by UK dance duo Booty Luv, who released it as their second single less than one year from the original release of the track. "Shine" was released in the United Kingdom via the Hed Kandi label on May 7, 2007. Booty Luv's version was well received and added to the BBC Radio 1's A-playlist. It peaked at number 10 on the UK Singles Chart, number six in Finland, and number 13 in the Netherlands.

The DJ Teddy-O remix of "Boogie 2nite" featured on the Maxi CD is also featured on Big Brovaz's Re-Entry album. However, the track is not listed as being a remix on the back cover. The song's music video is mainly of the two girls dancing in front of bright lights, with backing dancers.

Track listingsUK CD1 "Shine" (radio edit)
 "Boogie 2nite" (DJ Teddy-O remix)
 "Shine" (extended T&F and Moltosugo mix)
 "Shine" (Moto Blanco remix)
 "Shine" (Ian Carey remix)UK CD2 "Shine" (radio edit)
 "Shine" (extended T&F and Moltosugo mix)UK 12-inch single'''
A1. "Shine" (extended T&F and Moltosugo mix)
A2. "Shine" (Moto Blanco remix)
B1. "Shine" (Ian Carey remix)
B2. "Shine" (Hoxton Whores remix)

Charts

Weekly charts

Year-end charts

References

External links
luthervandross.com Luther Vandross Official Site

Luther Vandross songs
Booty Luv songs
2006 singles
2006 songs
2007 singles
Eurodance songs
Songs produced by Jimmy Jam and Terry Lewis
Songs written by Bernard Edwards
Songs written by Nile Rodgers
Songs written for films
Songs released posthumously